In mathematics, specifically in the representation theory of Lie groups, a Harish-Chandra module, named after the Indian mathematician and physicist Harish-Chandra, is a representation of a real Lie group, associated to a general representation, with regularity and finiteness conditions. When the associated representation is a -module, then its Harish-Chandra module is a representation with desirable factorization properties.

Definition

is smooth, and the subspace

is finite-dimensional.

Notes
In 1973, Lepowsky showed that any irreducible -module X is isomorphic to the Harish-Chandra module of an irreducible representation of G on a Hilbert space. Such representations are admissible, meaning that they decompose in a manner analogous to the prime factorization of integers. (Of course, the decomposition may have infinitely many distinct factors!) Further, a result of Harish-Chandra indicates that if G is a reductive Lie group with maximal compact subgroup K, and X is an irreducible
-module with a positive definite Hermitian form satisfying 

and

References

See also
(g,K)-module
Admissible representation
Unitary representation

Representation theory of Lie groups